Königsegg was a state in the southeastern part of what is now Baden-Württemberg, Germany. It emerged in 1192 as a lordship and was raised to a barony in 1470. It was partitioned in 1622 between itself, Königsegg-Aulendorf and Königsegg-Rothenfels.

In 1629, Königsegg was raised to an imperial estate and became a member of the College of the Counts of Swabia at the Reichstag. With the extinction of its male line in 1663, it was inherited by Königsegg-Aulendorf.

In 1804, Königsegg sold Rothenfels to Austria. In 1806, the Rheinbundakte mediatized Königsegg to the Kingdom of Württemberg. Today, the Counts of Königsegg still reside at Königseggwald Castle in Swabia and at Halbturn Castle in Austria.

Geography 
Königsegg was named after Königsegg Castle, which was located in Königsegg, today part of Guggenhausen. As of 1806, it consisted of two isolated parts, one around Königsegg and one around Aulendorf.

The state had no cities; its capital was Aulendorf. It was bordered by the County of Scheer, the Mainau Commandry of the Teutonic Order, the Abbacy of Weingarten, the Principality of Fürstenberg, the Abbacy of Schussenried, the County of Waldburg and Austria.

Lords of Königsegg (1192–1470) 
Berthold I of Fronhofen (1192–1209)
Eberhard I (1209–1228)
 Unknown
Eberhard II (1239–1268) with...
Berthold II (1239–1251)
Eberhard III (? – 1296)
Ulrich I (? – 1300)
John I (1300 – ?)
Ulrich II (? – 1375) with...
Henry with...
Berthold III (? – 1370) with...
Ulrich III
Ulrich IV (? – 1444)
John II
John III
Marquard (? – 1470)

Barons of Königsegg (1470–1663) 
Marquard (1470–1500)
John IV (1500–1544)
John Marquard (1544–1553) with...
John James (1544–1567)
Marquard IV (1567–1626) with...
George II (1567–1622)
John William (1626–1663)

Gallery

References 
 
  Königsegg and Königsegg-Aulendorf articles.

Swabian Circle
1806 disestablishments
States and territories established in 1192
Lordships of the Holy Roman Empire